Chawkay District is situated in the central part of Kunar Province, Afghanistan. The population was reported in 2006 as 31,600. The district center is the village of Chawkay at 726 m elevation in the valley of the Kunar River. Roughly 80% of the houses in the district were destroyed during the wars.

See also
Districts of Afghanistan
Kunar Raid

External links
District Profile
AIMS District Map

Districts of Kunar Province